Sanskar Bharti is an organization that works to promote Indian art, fine arts, and culture. Sanskar Bharti contributors included Indian intellectuals like Bhaurao Devars, Haribhau Wakankar, Nanaji Deshmukh, Madhavrao Devale, and Yogendra.

History 
The concept of Sanskar Bharti was first developed in 1954, and the first institute was established in Lucknow in 1981. In 1988, the Mirzapur unity was formed for the Ekadashi (Rangbhari Ekadashi) of the Falgun Shukla Party.

Presence and motto 
At present, there are over 1200 branches of Sanskar Bharti throughout the country. Its motto is "Art gives freedom by cutting the straits of evil". Sanskar Bharti works in various spheres of the society with the aim of awakening patriotism, cultivating appreciation of Indian culture and values, and encouraging the development of various arts and novice artists. Since 1990, the annual session of Sanskar Bharti has been organized in the form of an 'Art Sekhak Sangam', in which various forms of arts like music, plays, painting, poetry, literature, and dance are displayed. Various established and novice artists from across the country participate in this event.

Working committee 
The present organizational structure of Sanskar Bharti is as follows:

References

External links 
 Official website

1981 establishments in Uttar Pradesh
Organizations established in 1981
Rashtriya Swayamsevak Sangh
Organisations based in Lucknow